The Sierra DuFief is a mountain range 4 nautical miles (7 km) long with numerous sharp peaks, the highest at , extending in a northeast–southwest direction in the south part of Wiencke Island, in the Palmer Archipelago. It was discovered by the Belgian Antarctic Expedition, 1897–99, and named by Gerlache for Jean DuFief, then general secretary of the Belgian Royal Geographical Society.

See also
Janssen Peak

References 

Mountain ranges of the Palmer Archipelago
Wiencke Island